Chiva is a village in the Areni Municipality of the Vayots Dzor Province in Armenia.

Etymology 
The village is also known as Chivagyugh.

References

External links 

Populated places in Vayots Dzor Province